KADR (1400 AM) is a radio station licensed to Elkader, Iowa. It also serves Prairie du Chien, Wisconsin. The station primarily broadcasts a mix of current hits and oldies, along with local news, weather and sports. KADR is owned by and licensed to Design Homes, Inc. The transmitter and tower are located just southwest of town.

Previous logo

External links
 Official Website
 
 
 

ADR
Radio stations established in 1983
1983 establishments in Iowa